John Madejski Academy (JMA) is an 11–19 years old academy in Reading, Berkshire, England. JMA is part of the White Horse Federation Trust.

Louise Baker became principal of JMA in September 2020.

JMA's curriculum includes technology, music, textiles, computing, physical education, history, geography, drama, PSHE (personal, social, health and economic education), art, science, English and mathematics.

History
The academy was officially established on 1 September 2006 following the closure of its 11-16 predecessor, Thamesbridge College. Thamesbridge College was previously known as Ashmead School. It was officially opened by Tony Blair on 5 December 2007.

The new buildings were opened in 2010, with Sir John Madejski cutting the ribbon. In 2017, Madejski described financing the academy as "his proudest achievement".

The academy has been found to be "inadequate" twice by the regulator Ofcom, and "requires improvement" three times.

Architecture
The building was designed by international architecture firm Wilkinson Eyre  and it was shortlisted for an award at the World Architecture Festival 2008.

References

External links
 

Academies in Reading, Berkshire
Educational institutions established in 2005
Secondary schools in Reading, Berkshire
2005 establishments in England